Ancahuachanan (possibly from Quechua anka black-chested buzzard-eagle or eagle, wacha birth, to give birth -na, -n suffixes, "where the eagle is born") is a mountain in the Vilcanota mountain range in the Andes of Peru, about  high. It is situated in the Cusco Region, Quispicanchi Province, Ocongate District. Ancahuachanan lies northwest of Alcamarinayoc and east of Singrenacocha.

References

Mountains of Peru
Mountains of Cusco Region
Glaciers of Peru